Hendrik Van Dijck (born 5 February 1974, in Herentals) is a Belgian former professional road bicycle racer.

Victories 

1994
 Hasselt-Spa-Hasselt
1995
 5th stage Hofbrau Cup
 2nd Stage Niederösterreich Rundfahrt
1996
 Nokere Koerse
1997
 E3 Prijs Vlaanderen
 Nokere Koerse
 6th stage Tour of Sweden
 2nd stage Vuelta a Castilla y León
1999
 Grand Prix Rudy Dhaenens
2000
 Nokere Koerse
 1st stage Tour of Murcia

External links
Hendrik Van Dijck at The Cycling Web site

Belgian male cyclists
1974 births
Living people
People from Herentals
Cyclists from Antwerp Province